Boris Renaud (born 2 January 1946) is a Croatian ice hockey player. He competed in the men's tournaments at the 1964 Winter Olympics, the 1968 Winter Olympics and the 1972 Winter Olympics.

References

1946 births
Living people
Croatian ice hockey centres
Olympic ice hockey players of Yugoslavia
Ice hockey players at the 1964 Winter Olympics
Ice hockey players at the 1968 Winter Olympics
Ice hockey players at the 1972 Winter Olympics
Sportspeople from Varaždin
Yugoslav expatriate sportspeople in the Netherlands
Yugoslav expatriate ice hockey people
Expatriate ice hockey players in the Netherlands
Yugoslav ice hockey centres
KHL Medveščak Zagreb players